S3D or S-3D may refer to:

Stereoscopic 3D, see stereoscopy
3D film, films with S-3D
Stereoscopic video game, video games with S-3D
S3D, a supercomputer project that models the molecular physics of combustion
 S3D, a diode electrical component
 Rocketdyne S-3D, a rocket engine used in early US ballistic missiles